The Matador is a tequila-based cocktail.  Less widely known than the margarita, its structure is similarly simple, with three primary ingredients:  silver or blanco tequila, pineapple juice, and lime juice.  Its chief coupling of pineapple and a single spirit resembles a Jackhammer, a variant of the Screwdriver which substitutes pineapple juice for orange juice to mix with vodka.  Matadors are often presented differently, either in a martini glass or a champagne flute.

Background
The cocktail combines three Mexican exports: tequila, pineapple and lime. Due to typically high natural sugar content in many pineapple varieties, or use of sweetened commercially produced pineapple juice, additional sweeteners are not usually added.

In addition to these details, Matador is a commercial brand of tequila, though usage of a specifically branded spirit here is variable, similar to ingredient usage in other cocktails.

See also
 List of cocktails

References 

Cocktails with tequila
Cocktails with pineapple juice
Cocktails with lime juice
Mexican alcoholic drinks